67th NYFCC Awards
January 6, 2002

Best Film: 
 Mulholland Dr. 

The 67th New York Film Critics Circle Awards, honoring the best in film for 2001, were announced on 13 December 2001 and presented on 6 January 2002 by the New York Film Critics Circle.

Winners

Best Actor:
Tom Wilkinson – In the Bedroom
Runners-up: Jim Broadbent – Iris and Denzel Washington – Training Day
Best Actress:
Sissy Spacek – In the Bedroom
Runners-up: Naomi Watts – Mulholland Dr. and Tilda Swinton – The Deep End
Best Animated Film:
Waking Life
Runners-up: Shrek and Monsters, Inc.
Best Cinematography:
Christopher Doyle and Pin Bing Lee – In the Mood for Love (Fa yeung nin wa)
Runners-up: Roger Deakins – The Man Who Wasn't There and Peter Deming – Mulholland Dr.
Best Director:
Robert Altman – Gosford Park
Runners-up: David Lynch – Mulholland Dr. and Todd Field – In the Bedroom
Best Film:
Mulholland Dr.
Runners-up: Gosford Park and In the Bedroom
Best First Film:
Todd Field – In the Bedroom
Runners-up: Terry Zwigoff – Ghost World, Danis Tanović – No Man's Land, and Jonathan Glazer – Sexy Beast
Best Foreign Language Film:
In the Mood for Love (Fa yeung nin wa) • France/Hong Kong
Runners-up: No Man's Land • Bosnia and Herzegovina and Amores perros • Mexico
Best Non-Fiction Film:
The Gleaners and I
Runners-up: Startup.com and The Endurance
Best Screenplay:
Julian Fellowes – Gosford Park
Runners-up: Christopher Nolan – Memento and Wes Anderson and Owen Wilson – The Royal Tenenbaums
Best Supporting Actor:
Steve Buscemi – Ghost World
Runners-up: Ben Kingsley – Sexy Beast and Brian Cox – L.I.E.
Best Supporting Actress:
Helen Mirren – Gosford Park
Runners-up: Maggie Smith – Gosford Park and Scarlett Johansson – Ghost World
Special Award:
The restored and re-released Jacques Demy films Lola and Bay of Angels (La baie des anges)

References

External links
 2001 Awards

2001
New York Film Critics Circle Awards
2001 in American cinema
New
New York